Gutenberg Castle (German: Burg Gutenberg) is an intact  castle in the town of Balzers, Liechtenstein, in the centre of the municipality of Balzers, the southern-most municipality in the country. Gutenberg is one of the five castles of the principality and one of two that have survived intact until the present day. 

Unlike Vaduz Castle, Gutenberg Castle does not serve as a residence of the princely family of Liechtenstein and is open to the general public as a museum. The castle lies on a 70 meter high free-standing rock near the centre of Balzers and is accessible via a street and road known as Burgweg.

Etymology 

The first written record of the castle's name dates to 1296.

Prehistory

The castle hill has been inhabited since the neolithic period. Archaeological excavations have uncovered several prehistoric artifacts, including the  Mars von Gutenberg figurine, now on display in  
the Liechtenstein National Museum.

History

Gutenberg Castle began its existence as a medieval church and cemetery on a hilltop. In the early 12th century, the cemetery was cancelled and  fortification of the former church structure slowly began with the addition of a ring wall, forming a simple, roughly circular keep. During the 12th century, several additions followed, in particular the creation of the main tower by raising the height of the existing keep. Later on, the tower was fitted with merlons. In the 12th and early 13th century, the castle was owned by the lords of Frauenberg, a noble family from the Swiss canton of Graubünden. After the death of Heinrich von Frauenburg in 1314, the castle became the property of the House of Habsburg. It was then used primarily for guarding the borderlands between the local Habsburg-owned territories and those belonging to the independent Swiss cantons.

At the turn of the 15th century, the castle underwent extensive new construction works as part of an initiative by Holy Roman Emperor Maximilian I to repair the damage inflicted upon the castle by a siege in 1499, during the Swabian War. Gutenberg Castle was equipped until 1537 with a drawbridge, which had to be dismantled due to storm damage that year. It was never replaced. During the 17th and 18th centuries, the castle ceased to be used for military purposes and was damaged by several fires. It was still being used as a residence around 1750. After a fire in 1795 that greatly damaged Balzers, the castle ruins were used as a source of building material for the reconstruction of the town. The castle was purchased and slightly repaired by the town in 1824, then sold in 1854 to Princess Franziska of Liechtenstein.

The castle underwent substantial restoration between 1905 and 1912, under the supervision of  its new owner, Vaduz-born architect Egon Rheinberger. This restoration added a number of  new structures and buildings to the lower parts of the castle (see ground plan in references section for more details). After Rheinberger's death in 1936, the castle was rented by the municipality for various events and guests, until it was offered for sale in 1951. In 1979, the castle was purchased by the Principality of Liechtenstein for state and museum purposes. However, the last of the former private owners held her inherited rights to live in  the castle until her death in 2001.<ref>{{cite book |author=Cornelia Herrmann |chapter=Die Kunstdenkmäler des Fürstentums Liechtenstein. Das Oberland|title= Gesellschaft für Schweizerische Kunstgeschichte GSK: Die Kunstdenkmäler der Schweiz|location= Bern|year= 2007|ISBN=978-3-906131-85-6|language=de}}</ref>

Today

The bailey (Vorburg'') of the castle is open to visitors free of charge all year round. The castle's chapel and rose garden, reconstructed in 2010, are accessible free of charge every Sunday between 10:00 and 19:00 during the summer tourist season (1 May – 31 October). Guided tours of Gutenberg Castle and its renting for weddings and cultural events are available only during the summer tourist season and need to be arranged in advance by appointment.

Gallery

See also
List of castles in Liechtenstein

References

External links

 Gutenberg Castle Official Website (in German)

Museums in Liechtenstein
Balzers
Castles in Liechtenstein